Bob Montgomery (May 12, 1937 – December 4, 2014) was an American singer, songwriter, record producer and publisher.

Biography
Montgomery was born in Lampasas, Texas, United States. He was a songwriting partner and best friend of Buddy Holly, performing together as the duo "Buddy and Bob" while teenagers in high school. Initially, they played a variety of bluegrass music, which evolved into rockabilly sounds.

Montgomery met Holly at Hutchinson Junior High School in Lubbock, Texas, in 1949. They started playing together at school assemblies and on local radio shows. Montgomery sang lead and Holly harmonized. They soon had a weekly Sunday radio show on station KDAV. On October 14, 1955, Bill Haley & His Comets played a concert at the Fair Park Auditorium, and Montgomery, Holly and bassist Larry Welborn were also on the bill. Eddie Crandall, Marty Robbins' manager, spoke to KDAV station owner Pappy Dave Stone and told him he was interested in Holly as a solo performer. Holly's career then began after demo recordings of his music were made and sent to Decca Records.

Montgomery co-wrote some of Holly's songs, such as "Heartbeat", "Wishing", and "Love's Made a Fool of You". He wrote the pop standard "Misty Blue" and, for Patsy Cline, "Back in Baby's Arms". His son Kevin recorded a version of this, which appeared on his album True. Montgomery produced Bobby Goldsboro's 1968 number 1 hit "Honey" and his follow up 1973 number 9 UK hit, “Summer (The First Time)”.

Montgomery died on December 4, 2014, in Lee's Summit, Missouri, of Parkinson's disease, at the age of 77.

Discography

Singles
 "Taste Of The Blues" b/w "Because I Love You", Brunswick, November 1959

Albums
 Holly in the Hills, Buddy Holly & Bob Montgomery, Coral, January 1965

References

External links
 45cat Bob Montgomery

1937 births
2014 deaths
People from Lampasas, Texas
American country rock singers
American country singer-songwriters
American male singer-songwriters
Record producers from Texas
Singer-songwriters from Texas
Bluegrass musicians from Texas
American rockabilly musicians
Neurological disease deaths in Missouri
Deaths from Parkinson's disease
Country musicians from Texas